The Institute of Chartered Accountants of Sierra Leone (ICASL) is a professional accountancy body in  Sierra Leone.  It is the sole organization in Sierra Leone with the right to award the Chartered Accountant designation.
ICASL is a member of the International Federation of Accountants (IFAC).

References

Member bodies of the International Federation of Accountants